Board Game is the second extended play by Australian punk rock band One Dollar Short. It was released in March 2001 and peaked at number 39 on the ARIA Charts.

Track listing 
 "Board Game" - 2:43
 "Starry Night" - 3:03
 "Perfect Day" - 3:16
 "Tim's Brother" - 2:26

Charts

Release history

References

2001 EPs
EPs by Australian artists
One Dollar Short albums
Indie pop EPs
Synth-pop EPs